David Morgan Powell (born 19 January 1935) is a Welsh former professional footballer who played as a left back.

References

External links
 Rochdale at Post War English & Scottish Football League A–Z Player's Database
 

Living people
1935 births
Welsh footballers
Footballers from Swansea
Association football fullbacks
Blackpool F.C. players
Rochdale A.F.C. players
English Football League players